The Taiwan Constitution Association (TCA) is a Taiwanese political party affiliated with the Pan-Green Coalition.

History
The party was founded on 8 November 2007.

See also
 List of political parties in the Republic of China

References

External links
 Official website

2007 establishments in Taiwan
Political parties in Taiwan
Political parties established in 2007
Taiwan independence movement